John Paul Rainey  (July 16, 1864 – November 11, 1912) was a Major League Baseball player who played for the 1887 New York Giants and 1890 Buffalo Bisons.

External links

1864 births
1912 deaths
19th-century baseball players
Major League Baseball outfielders
New York Giants (NL) players
Winona Clippers players
Hamilton Clippers players
Hamilton Hams players
Buffalo Bisons (minor league) players
Manchester Amskoegs players
Detroit Wolverines (minor league) players
Binghamton Bingoes players
Terre Haute Hottentots players
Green Bay Bays players
Baseball players from Michigan
People from Birmingham, Michigan